Sidlo, Sidło or Šídlo is a Slavic surname. Notable people with the surname include:

Janusz Sidło (1933–1993), Polish javelin thrower
Josef Šídlo, Czech cyclist

Slavic-language surnames